The Ivorian football league system chronicles the tabulated info regarding the football league available in Ivory Coast.

Men

National Leagues

Regional Leagues

External links
Fédération Ivoirienne de Football

  
Ivory Coast